Mġarr, formerly known as Mgiarro, is a village in the Northern Region of Malta. Mġarr is a typical rural village situated in an isolated region, west of Mosta. It is surrounded with rich farmland and vineyards. Many of its 4,840 inhabitants are farmers or are engaged in some sort of agricultural activity. Maltese pop singers Christabelle Borg and Gaia Cauchi both hail from this town.

History

Mġarr has two important prehistoric sites: Ta' Ħaġrat, which is still in a good state of preservation, stands in a field near the village centre; Ta' Skorba, excavated in 1963, lies just outside the village.

Mġarr's history is that of a farming community patronised by various of the Mdina patrician families. Mġarr was granted by the King of Sicily to the Inguanez family, and over time they sold it to the Falsone family. Over time, land was divided and given to all descendants.

Mġarr's rustic environs embrace rustic spots including Wardija, Fomm ir-Riħ, Għajn Tuffieħa and Ġnejna Bay. 

San Anton School is a private school located in Mġarr.

Church
It was only at the beginning of the 20th century that Mġarr built its parish and the church was fully completed. The church has one of the largest domes in the world , just behind the church of Mosta. The unique shape, that of an oval dome, is attributed to the extensive funds raised from the sale of more than 300,000 eggs.

The parish church of the Assumption of St. Mary is a miniature copy of the Mosta Dome. Its construction began in 1912 and depended on voluntary work and the generous contributions obtained by parishioners from the sale of agricultural products. Despite efforts to speed up the work, the church was not completed until 1946.

The church is located on high ground and its elevated parapet has a view of the surrounding fields and hills. In Mġarr there are still many houses surrounding the narrow streets around the church. Modern buildings and home ownership are new additions to the village.

Zones in Mġarr
Abatija
Ballut
Binġemma
Binġemma Gap
Dar il-Ħamra
Darrenzi
Dwejra
Fawwara
Fomm ir-Riħ
Ġnejna Bay
Għajn Tuffieħa
Għemieri
Ħanxara
Ħotba ta' San Martin
Iċ-Ċagħaq
Iċ-Ċarċar
Id-Dahar
Il-Għalqa
L-Imselliet
L-Iskorvit
Lippija
Misraħ Miet
Ras il-Pellegrin
Ras il-Wied
Skorba
Ta' Mrejnu
Ta' Tewma
Tal-Għajn
Ta' Qarawas
Tal-Faċċol
Tal-Ħżejjen
Tal-Palma
Tal-Qanfud
Tar-Ragħad
Tas-Santi
Wied Santi
Wied tal-Ġnejna
Wied tal-Imselliet
Żebbiegħ

Notable people
Myles Beerman (born 1999), professional footballer who plays as a defender for Rangers F.C.
Christabelle Borg (born 1992), singer, represented Malta in the Eurovision Song Contest 2018
Gaia Cauchi (born 2002), singer, won the Junior Eurovision Song Contest 2013

Twin towns – sister cities

Mġarr is twinned with:
 Mathi, Italy

References

External links
Mġarr Local Council Website

 
Towns in Malta
Local councils of Malta